Patrick Fölser (born 16 November 1976) is an Austrian handball player for SG Handball West Wien and the Austrian national team.

References

1976 births
Living people
Austrian male handball players